Coopertown Meetinghouse (also called Coopertown Church and Coopertown Union Sunday School) is a historic church meeting house in Edgewater Park Township, Burlington County, New Jersey, United States.

It was built in 1802 and added to the National Register of Historic Places in 1978.

See also
National Register of Historic Places listings in Burlington County, New Jersey

References

Churches on the National Register of Historic Places in New Jersey
Churches in Burlington County, New Jersey
National Register of Historic Places in Burlington County, New Jersey
New Jersey Register of Historic Places
Edgewater Park, New Jersey